Vilmos Varjú (10 June 1937 –  17 February 1994) was a Hungarian shot putter. He competed at the 1964, 1968 and 1972 Olympics and finished in 3rd, 13th and 8th place, respectively. Varjú won European titles in 1962 and 1966.

References

External links 
 

1937 births
1994 deaths
People from Gyula
Hungarian male shot putters
Olympic bronze medalists for Hungary
Athletes (track and field) at the 1964 Summer Olympics
Athletes (track and field) at the 1968 Summer Olympics
Athletes (track and field) at the 1972 Summer Olympics
Olympic athletes of Hungary
European Athletics Championships medalists
Medalists at the 1964 Summer Olympics
Olympic bronze medalists in athletics (track and field)
Sportspeople from Békés County
20th-century Hungarian people